Rihards Lomažs (born 13 April 1996) is a Latvian professional basketball player for Baskets Oldenburg of the Basketball Bundesliga.

Career
Lomažs joined Basketball Bundesliga club EWE Baskets Oldenburg in November 2022.

References 

Living people
1996 births
Latvian men's basketball players
Shooting guards
BK Jūrmala players
BK Ventspils players
ASVEL Basket players
BG Göttingen players
Merkezefendi Belediyesi Denizli Basket players
Basket Zaragoza players
EWE Baskets Oldenburg players
Latvian expatriate sportspeople in Germany